Mauritius is an island of Africa's southeast coast located in the Indian Ocean, east of Madagascar. It is geologically located within the Somali plate.

Statistics 

Area (includes Agaléga, Cargados Carajos (Saint Brandon), and Rodrigues):
total:
2,011 km2
land:
2,030 km2
water:
10 km2
note: includes Agalega Islands, Cargados Carajos Shoais (Saint Brandon), and Rodrigues.

Coastline:
177 km

Maritime claims:
territorial sea:

continental shelf:
 or to the edge of the continental margin
exclusive economic zone:

Elevation extremes:
lowest point:
Indian Ocean 0 m
highest point:
Piton de la Petite Rivière Noire 828 m

Natural resources:
arable land, fish

Land use:
arable land:
38.24%
permanent crops:
1.96%
other:
59.80% (2011)

Irrigated land:
212.2 km2 (2003)

Total renewable water resources:
2.75 km3 (2011)

Environment - current issues:
water pollution, degradation of coral reefs

Environment - international agreements:
party to:
Antarctic-Marine Living Resources, Biodiversity, Climate Change, Climate Change-Kyoto Protocol, Desertification, Endangered Species, Environmental Modification, Hazardous Wastes, Law of the Sea, Marine Life Conservation, Ozone Layer Protection, Ship Pollution, Wetlands

Geography - note:
The main island is from which the country derives its name, former home of the dodo, a large flightless bird related to pigeons, driven to extinction by the end of the 17th century through a combination of hunting and the introduction of predatory species.

Table of Islands

notes: excludes Tromelin and other îles éparses

Climate 

The local climate is tropical, modified by southeast trade winds; there is a warm, dry winter from May to November and a hot, wet, and humid summer from November to May. Anticyclones affect the country during May to September.

Cyclones affect Mauritius during November–April. Hollanda (1994) and Dina (2002) were the worst two of the more recent cyclones to have affected the island.

Terrain 
The country's landscape consists of a small coastal plain rising to discontinuous mountains encircling a central plateau. Mauritius is almost completely surrounded by reefs that may pose maritime hazards. The main island is of volcanic origin.

The mountains with the greatest prominence include:

Piton de la Petite Rivière Noire, 828 m, the highest point of the island

Le Morne Brabant, 556 m

Tourelle de Tamarin, 563 m

Corps de Garde, 720 m, prominence 382 m

Le Pouce, 820 m, prominence 352 m

Pieter Both, 820 m, prominence 229 m

Montagne Cocotte, 780 m

Extreme points 

This is a list of the extreme points of Mauritius, the points that are farther north, south, east or west than any other location.
 Northernmost point – Tappe à Terre, North Island, Agaléga Islands
 Easternmost point – Trou d’Argent, Rodrigues Island
 Southernmost point - Le Gris Gris, Savanne District, Mauritius
 Westernmost point - North West Point, North Island, Agaléga Islands

See also 
 Outer islands of Mauritius

References

External links 
 Mauritius Travel Information (English)